The Hall of Fantasy is an American old-time radio dramatic anthology. It was broadcast on the Mutual Broadcasting System from August 22, 1952, until September 28, 1953.

Format and background
The Hall of Fantasy featured stories with supernatural themes. Radio historian John Dunning wrote in his reference work Tune in Yesterday: "The difference between this program and its competitors was that here, man was usually the loser. The supernatural was offered as something respectable, awesome, sometimes devastating and always frightening." 

An early version of the show was developed by Richard Thorne and Carl Greyson and broadcast on KALL in Salt Lake City, Utah. In 1949, Thorne revived the program on WGN in Chicago, enhancing the program's appeal with "unusually excellent production values" and sound effects.

Stories adapted for the show included "The Cask of Amontillado", by Edgar Allan Poe, and "Green Tea" by Sheridan Le Fanu. Thorne also wrote original scripts for the program, with the series having about equal numbers of original stories and adaptations.

Personnel

As an anthology, The Hall of Fantasy had no continuing characters. Actors frequently heard in its episodes included Harry Elders, Eloise Kummer, Carl Grayson, and Maurice Copeland. Richard Thorne, who produced and directed, also appeared frequently. Leroy Olliger and Glenn Ransom also directed, and Harold Turner provided the music.

References

External links

Logs
Log of episodes of The Hall of Fantasy from The Digital Deli Too
Log of episodes of The Hall of Fantasy from Jerry Haendiges Vintage Radio Logs
Log of episodes of The Hall of Fantasy from Old Time Radio Researchers Group
Log of episodes of The Hall of Fantasy from radioGOLDINdex
Log of episodes of The Hall of Fantasy from Old Time Radio Program Logs

Scripts
Scripts of episodes of The Hall of Fantasy from Generic Radio Workshop Vintage Radio Script Library

Streaming
Episodes of The Hall of Fantasy from the Internet Archive
Episodes of The Hall of Fantasy from OTR.Network Library
Episodes of The Hall of Fantasy from Old Time Radio Researchers Group Library
Episodes of The Hall of Fantasy from Zoot Radio

1952 radio programme debuts
1953 radio programme endings
1950s American radio programs
Mutual Broadcasting System programs
American radio dramas
Anthology radio series